From Where You Dream: The Process of writing fiction is a transcription and condensation of Robert Olen Butler's Masters class on writing. Put together and edited by Janet Burroway, it emphasizes dreamspace or unconscious writing as opposed to thinking or analytical writing in order to create a good or true work of art. It purports that yearning, or motivation, is the key point of craft missed by inexperienced writers.

It is cut up into three main sections, "The Lecture", "The Workshop", and "The Stories Analyzed", where he details why getting to the "white hot" unconscious is important and tactics on how to find it and write it well.

Paperback Grove Press 

Books about education
2005 non-fiction books
Books about writing